Sam Rogers (born April 12, 1995) is a former American football fullback and coach who is currently the head coach at Hanover High School. He played college football at Virginia Tech, and spent time on the rosters of the Los Angeles Rams and Buffalo Bills.

High school career
In high school, Rogers played a multitude of positions, including quarterback, running back, wide receiver, and multiple defensive positions. He rushed for 1,178 yards and 18 touchdowns and threw for 1,006 yards and six touchdowns as a senior, and caught 5 passes for 90 yards. During that time, he also played basketball and lacrosse.

College career
Rogers played college football at Virginia Tech.

Professional career

Los Angeles Rams
Rogers was drafted by the Los Angeles Rams in the sixth round, 206th overall, in the 2017 NFL Draft. He was the third of four Virginia Tech Hokies to be selected that year. He was waived on September 2, 2017, and was signed to the Rams' practice squad the next day. He signed a reserve/future contract with the Rams on January 8, 2018. On May 15, 2018, Rogers was waived by the Rams.

Buffalo Bills
Rogers signed with the Buffalo Bills on August 15, 2018, but was waived on September 1, 2018.

Coaching career
After his NFL playing career was over, Rogers joined Benedictine College Preparatory as an assistant coach for their football team in 2018. He later joined the coaching staff of his alma mater, Hanover High School, beginning as an assistant in 2019 and becoming the head coach in 2020.

References

External links
Virginia Tech Hokies bio

1995 births
Living people
People from Mechanicsville, Virginia
American football fullbacks
Players of American football from Virginia
Virginia Tech Hokies football players
Los Angeles Rams players
Buffalo Bills players